James Stobie (date of birth and death unknown) was the factor to John Murray, the 4th Duke of Atholl's in the late 17 hundreds.

He is best known for designing the layout of Perthshire villages on the bequest of the 4th Duke of Atholl. In 1784 he designed the village of Stanley and in 1786 he designed the layout of Pitcairngreen.

References

People from Perth and Kinross
People associated with Perth and Kinross